Andrew Yang is an American entrepreneur, 2021 Democratic candidate for Mayor of New York City and former 2020 presidential candidate.

Andrew Yang may also refer to:

 Andrew Yang (Taiwanese politician) (born 1955)
 Andrew Yang (artist), American artist